Perch Lake Mountain is a mountain located in the Catskill Mountains of New York south of Andes. Hemlock Knoll is located north, and Hunt Hill is located south-southwest of Perch Lake Mountain.

References

Gallery

Mountains of Delaware County, New York
Mountains of New York (state)